The Korean Curling Championships (branded as the KB Financial Korean Curling Championships since 2012) are the annual Korean men's and women's curling championships, organized by the Korean Curling Federation (KCF). The winners of the championship qualify for the Korean National Team. Until 2022, they earned the right to represent South Korea at the Pacific-Asia Curling Championships (PACC) and the World Curling Championships if they reached qualification. Every four years, the winners also qualify to represent South Korea at the Winter Olympic Games if the country received a berth. The championship also qualifies the winners for the Asian Winter Games if it is held during the season they are the national team.

Starting in 2022, the winners of the championships qualified for the Pan Continental Curling Championships, which replaced the PACC. If the team placed in the top five at the Pan-Continental, then they qualified for the upcoming World Championship.

The national championship is usually held in June or July, making it the first event of the new curling season.

Format
The Korean Curling Championships are held in a round robin format. After the preliminary round is complete, the top four teams advance to the playoff round. Until 2022, the page playoff system was used, awarding the teams that finished first and second in the round robin an extra game incase of a loss. In 2022, the championship switched to using a single-elimination system, where the top ranked team plays the fourth ranked team and second place plays third in a semifinal round.

Results

The earliest known results from the Korean Curling Championships are from 2011.

Men

Women

References

External links
Korean Curling Championships

2001 establishments in Korea
2003 establishments in Korea
Curling competitions in South Korea
Recurring sporting events established in 2001
National curling championships